Republic of Korea has competed at every celebration of the Asian Games except the 1951 Asian Games, including hosting the Summer Games in 1986, 2002, and 2014 and the Winter Games in 1999.

South Korean athletes have won a total of 2235 medals at the Asian Games and have won a total of 249 medals at the Asian Winter Games, with short-track speed skating and speed skating as the main medal-producing sports. However, South Korea never finished at the top of the medal table of an Asian Game (the closest was in 1986 edition).

Asian Games

*Red border color indicates tournament was held on home soil.

Medals by Games

Medals by sport

Medals by individual

Asian Winter Games

*Red border color indicates tournament was held on home soil.

Medals by Games

Medals by sport

East Asian Games

*Red border color indicates tournament was held on home soil.

Medals by Games

Asian Indoor and Martial Arts Games

*Red border color indicates tournament was held on home soil.

Medals by Games

Asian Beach Games

Medals by Games

Asian Youth Games

Medals by Games

Asian Para Games

*Red border color indicates tournament was held on home soil.

Medals by Games

Asian Youth Para Games

Medals by Games

See also
South Korea at the Olympics
South Korea at the 2010 Asian Para Games

References

External links
sports123.com
 Asian Winter Games at KOC website